Wendy Brown may refer to:

 Wendy Brown (sprinter) (born 1950), New Zealand sprinter
 Wendy Brown (political theorist) (born 1955), American professor of political science at the University of California, Berkeley
 Wendy Brown (heptathlete) (born 1966), retired heptathlete from the United States
 Wendy Brown, political activist and plaintiff (see Clyde cancer cluster)